Namibiana occidentalis, also known as the western threadsnake or western worm snake, is a species of snake in the family Leptotyphlopidae. It is found in Namibia and north-western South Africa.

References

Namibiana
Snakes of Africa
Reptiles of Namibia
Reptiles of South Africa
Taxa named by Vivian Frederick Maynard FitzSimons
Reptiles described in 1962